Clement Wainyae Sinyinda (born 2 January 1952) is a Zambian politician. He served as a member of the National Assembly for the Senanga Central constituency between 2006 and 2011. He also held the post of Ngambela of the Barotse Royal Establishment, a Barotseland self-determination movement.

Biography

Sinyinda was born in 1952 into a family from Situnda, a village in Senanga District. He worked as a teacher before entering politics. Prior to the 2006 general elections he was chosen as the Movement for Multi-Party Democracy candidate in the Senanga Central constituency and defeated the incumbent MP Walusiku Situmbeko with 70% of the vote and an 8,700 majority. In October 2007 he was appointed Deputy Minister of Education. He did not contest the 2011 general elections.

In January 2012, he was appointed Ngambela (Prime Minister) of Barotseland. However, he resigned from the post in November, claiming he had not been supported by the Litunga (King of Barotseland), Lubosi II Imwiko. In September 2013, he was arrested and charged with treason for allegedly supporting the secession of Western Province. After spending three months in custody, he was released in December after the government abandoned the prosecution.

He was elected the leader of the Barotse National Freedom Alliance in 2016.

References

1952 births
Living people
Zambian educators
Members of the National Assembly of Zambia
Movement for Multi-Party Democracy politicians
People from Senanga District
Barotse independence activists
Heads of government who were later imprisoned